Vanishing Point is a BBC Books original novel written by Stephen Cole and based on the long-running British science fiction television series Doctor Who. It features the Eighth Doctor, Fitz and Anji.

External links
The Cloister Library - Vanishing Point

2001 British novels
2001 science fiction novels
Eighth Doctor Adventures
Novels by Stephen Cole